The 2015–16 Cincinnati Bearcats men's basketball team represented the University of Cincinnati during the 2015–16 NCAA Division I men's basketball season. The Bearcats, were led by tenth year head coach Mick Cronin, who returned full-time after taking a hiatus in December 2014. The Bearcats played their home games on Ed Jucker Court at Fifth Third Arena and were members of the American Athletic Conference. They finished the season with a record of 22–11, 12–6 in AAC play to finish in a tie for third place in conference. The Bearcats lost in the quarterfinals of the AAC tournament to UConn for the second consecutive year. They received an at-large bid as a #9 seed to the NCAA tournament. They lost in the First Round of the Tournament to Saint Joseph's.

Previous season
The Bearcats finished the 2014–15 season with a record of 23–11, 13–5 in AAC play to finish in a tie for third place in conference. They lost in the quarterfinals of the AAC tournament to UConn. They received an at-large bid as a #8 seed to the NCAA tournament where they defeated #9 seeded Purdue in the Second Round before losing to #1 ranked Kentucky in the Third Round.

Offseason

Departing players

Incoming Transfers

Recruiting class of 2015

Recruiting class of 2016

Roster

Depth chart

Source

Schedule

|-
!colspan=12 style=| Exhibition
|-

|-
!colspan=12 style=| Non-conference regular season
|-

|-
!colspan=12 style=|  AAC Regular Season 

|-
!colspan=12 style=""| AAC Tournament 

|-
!colspan=12 style=| NCAA Tournament

Awards and milestones

American Athletic Conference honors

All-AAC Awards
Defensive Player of the Year: Gary Clark

All-AAC First Team
Troy Caupain

All-AAC Second Team
Gary Clark

Player of the Week
Week 3: Troy Caupain
Week 17: Troy Caupain

Rookie of the Week
Week 7: Jacob Evans
Week 16: Jacob Evans

Source

Rankings

References

Cincinnati Bearcats men's basketball seasons
Cincinnati Bearcats
Cincinnati
Cincinnati Bearcats
Cincinnati Bearcats